This is a list of defunct airlines of Albania.

See also

 List of airlines of Albania
 List of airports in Albania

References

Airlines, defunct

Albania